

League tables
A total of 58 teams contest the division, which is divided into four tables west, center-west, east and center-east, including—sides remaining in the division from last season, three relegated from the Algerian Championnat National 2, and three promoted from the Regional League I (4th Division).

Groupe Centre-Est

Groupe Centre-Ouest

Groupe Est

Groupe Ouest

References

Inter-Régions Division seasons
4